Kostadin Stoykov (born 7 December 1977) is a Bulgarian volleyball player. He competed in the men's tournament at the 2008 Summer Olympics. Player of Bulgarian volleyball team VC Slivnishki geroi (Slivnitsa).

References

External links
 

1977 births
Living people
Bulgarian men's volleyball players
Olympic volleyball players of Bulgaria
Volleyball players at the 2008 Summer Olympics
People from Smolyan